Bradley A. Stephens is a Republican Party politician currently serving as from the 20th district member of the Illinois House of Representatives  and the village president (mayor) of Rosemont, Illinois.

Stephens was appointed to his seat in the Illinois House of Representatives on June 29, 2019 to replace Michael P. McAuliffe, and won election to a full term in the Illinois House of Representatives in 2020. He has served as the village president of Rosemont since being appointed in 2007 to succeed his father Donald Stephens (who had died in office), and has since been elected to three full four-year terms.

Stephens has also served as a member of the Illinois State Toll Highway Authority board of director, the Leyden Township supervisor (an elected position), a member of the Pace board of directors, and a Rosemont village trustee (an elected position). Stephens is the Leyden Township Republican Party committeeperson, an elected party position.

Early life and family

Stephens' family is highly influential in Rosemont, Illinois' government. Stephens' father Donald Stephens was a founder of the village, and, until his death in 2007, served as its first village president. As of 2010, the Stephens family had ten family members on the village's payroll, cumulatively earning nearly $1 million in  annual salary. At that time, five members of his family were elected officials in the city.

Stephens' mother was Estelle “Pat” Stephens.

Early career
In 1989, Stephens became a Rosemont village trustee, an elected position. He would continue to hold this position for 18 years, until he was appointed mayor in 2007.

Stephens also served as Leyden Township supervisor, an elected position. He would hold this position, before resigning from it in 2013.

Stephens has served as the Leyden Township Republican Party committeeperson, an elected party position. He has won election to this position every four years since 2006 by a vote of those participating in the Republican primaries.

Rosemont village presidency (2007–present)
Stephens was appointed village president of Rosemont by the Village of Rosemont Board of Trustees on May 1, 2007, two weeks after his father, Donald Stephens, died in office. He was sworn-in on May 6. He was elected to a full term in 2009, and has been reelected as village president in 2013, 2017, and 2021.

While mayor, he has continued to serve as the Leyden Township Republican Party committeeperson. He also, until 2013, continued to serve as Leyden Township supervisor.

Stepens earns a $260,000 salary as mayor, making him one of the highest-paid mayors.

Stephens was a member of the Pace board of directors.

Among the major developments that came to the village during Stephens' tenure was the Fashion Outlets of Chicago, which opened in 2013.

Stephens sought to lure the Chicago Cubs Major League Baseball team to build a new stadium for the team in the village, offering to, free-of-charge, give them 25 acres of land in the village to the west of the Interstate 294 and south of Balmoral Avenue. The village offered hundreds of millions of dollars in tax incentives to the team. This came amid negotiations between the city of Chicago and the Cubs over proposed renovations to the team's existing stadium, Wrigley Field. The Chicago Cubs ultimately remained at Wrigley Field, undertaking renovations. Stephens would bring a  professional baseball stadium to the village in the form of the form of Impact Field, which opened in 2018 as the home of the Chicago Dogs independent baseball team.

Stephens was appointed as a member of the Illinois State Toll Highway Authority's board of directors in June 2018. His tenure on this board of directors would be relatively brief.

In July 2019, the Chicago Sun-Times reported that the FBI was investigating Rosemont. The Sun-Times reported that the FBI were investigating   possible wrongdoing in the city's public safety department, including allegations that members of the department had illegally consumed and distributed illegal narcotic painkillers. The Sun-Times also reported that the FBI were looking at a contract awarded for  Monterry Security Consultants, Inc. (a politically-connected security company) to oversee security at public venues (including Allstate Arena, Rosemont Theatre, and the Donald E. Stephens Convention Center).

Member of the Illinois House of Representatives (2019–present)
Stephens was appointed to serve as the member of the Illinois House of Representatives from the 20th district on June 29, 2019, filling the seat previously held by Michael P. McAuliffe.

The 20th district includes all or parts of Des Plaines, Park Ridge, Rosemont, Schiller Park, Norridge, Harwood Heights, Franklin Park, and the Chicago neighborhoods of Edison Park, Norwood Park, and O'Hare. Stephens is the only Republican representing a significant portion of Chicago in the Illinois General Assembly, and indeed the only Republican representing a significant portion of the city above the county level.

In the 2019–20 session (the 101st Illinois General Assembly), he served on the Appropriations-Elementary & Secondary Education; Cybersecurity, Data Analytics, & IT; Health Care Licenses; Financial Institutions; Veterans' Affairs; and Mental Health committees.

Stephens was elected to a full term in the Illinois House of Representatives in 2020. In his reelection campaign, he painted himself as standing against Democratic Party political boss Michael Madigan, and tied his Democratic opponent, Michelle Darbo, to Madigan (who, indeed, had been giving her campaign financial backing). Despite being a Republican, Stephens himself had past ties to Madigan, as he had once been a significant donor to Madigan. Democrats attacked Stephens for accepting political contributions to his reelection campaign from red light camera contractors.

In the 2020–21 session (the 102nd Illinois General Assembly), he is serving on the Appropriations-Elementary & Secondary Education; Cybersecurity, Data Analytics, & IT; Financial Institutions; Health Care Licenses; Mental Health; and Veterans' Affairs committees.

Personal life
Stephens lives in Rosemont with his wife, Suzi. Stephens is the father of five children.

Electoral history

Rosemont village Trustee

Leyden Township Supervisor

Rosemont Village President

Leyden Township Republican Committeeperson

Illinois House of Representatives
2020

References

External links
Representative Bradley Stephens (R) 20th District at the Illinois General Assembly
101st

Year of birth missing (living people)
21st-century American politicians
Republican Party members of the Illinois House of Representatives
Illinois city council members
Mayors of places in Illinois
People from Rosemont, Illinois
Living people